Boronia rivularis, commonly known as the Wide Bay boronia, is a plant in the citrus family Rutaceae and is endemic to the Wide Bay–Burnett area of eastern Queensland. It is an erect, woody shrub with pinnate leaves and white to pink, four-petalled flowers.

Description
The leaves are pinnate and have between three and thirteen leaflets. The eight stamens have hairy edges.

Taxonomy and naming
Boronia rivularis was first formally described in 1942 by Cyril Tenison White and the description was published in Proceedings of the Royal Society of Queensland. The specific epithet (rivularis) is a Latin word meaning "of a brook", as the species was discovered in damp gullies.

Distribution and habitat
Wide Bay boronia grows in moist and swampy areas in heath, woodland or open forest. It is found on Fraser Island and in the Cooloola area.

Conservation
Boronia rivularis is classed as "near threatened" under the Queensland Government Nature Conservation Act 1992.

References 

rivularis
Flora of Queensland
Plants described in 1942
Taxa named by Cyril Tenison White